Conflict is a historical novel by Australian author E. V. Timms.

Plot
The novel is set mostly in France and the Mediterranean during the reign of Louis XIV. Some French fishermen are captured by Moslem corsairs and forced to become galley slaves. They rebel against their captors and turn pirate, later encountering English warships.

Critical response
Some critics compared Timms with the best of Rafael Sabatini.

References

External links
Conflict at AustLit
Complete copy of novel

1934 Australian novels
Australian historical novels
Novels about pirates
Novels set in Early Modern France
Angus & Robertson books